Ballylinney Presbyterian Church is a Presbyterian church in Ballylinney, County Antrim, Northern Ireland.

History 
The foundation stone for Ballylinney Church was laid on 6 May 1835 with the completion of the building on 11 September 1836. By the year 1840 Ballylinney Church became part of the Presbytery of Carrickfergus and by 1842 the first elders of the church were ordained.

It was only in 1883 that the church paid for the first Presbyterian Manse to be built on the Hillhead Road where the Minister, Rev Williams, would reside with his family. The house was a double story and had a large garden encircling the house. Between the years of 1923 and 1956 saw the addition of various luxuries such as the first organ and electric heating and lighting being installed. By 1966 the stables which were still on the property were then converted for the church hall and to provide both a kitchen and toilet facilities for the congregation.

In 1977 the new hall was built and named after the current minister, Rev C. F. Young, and it was by this time that the congregations Children's Church and Girls Brigade were being run from the newly built facilities. Then in 1997 additional buildings were added to the existing hall and also named after Rev C.F. Young.

These days only some of the congregation members are farmers, but by far the majority are young families where the parents commute to other areas, such as Larne, Belfast or Ballymena. At this time there are 340 homes connected to this church.

Ministers of Ballylinney 
 Rev. Isaac Adams 1837 - 1880
 Rev. James Foster Williams 1881 - 1899
 Rev. Hugh Craig Meeke 1899 - 1904
 Rev. John Kyle 1905 - 1911
 Rev. Wilson Moreland Kennedy 1912 - 1921
 Rev. Ernest McConnell 1921 - 1958
 Rev. Charles Frances Young 1959 - 1982
 Rev. Roy Vallely 1983 - 2009
 Rev. Emerson McDowell 2010–2023

See also 
 Presbyterian Church in Ireland

References
 Ballylinney Church

Presbyterian churches in Northern Ireland
Churches in County Antrim